Mazor (lit. Cure) is a moshav in central Israel. Located in the Sharon plain around three kilometres south-east of Petah Tikva and covering 2,300 dunams, it falls under the jurisdiction of Hevel Modi'in Regional Council.

History
The moshav was established in 1949 by Jewish immigrants from Czechoslovakia and Hungary and by native-born Israelis. It was initially named Mizra Har (lit. Sown Field on a Mountain), a name derived from the name of the nearby depopulated Arab village of Umm-Zara, more commonly known as al-Muzayri'a. The moshav was later renamed Mazor, Hebrew for Remedy, in honor of the medicinal herb factory established there by the herbalist Mordechai Klein.   Mazor's early days are depicted in a work of historical fiction, Kfar BaSfar ("A Village on the Border") by Gershon Erich Steiner, one of Mazor's founders.

Mazor was founded on land belonging both to the depopulated Palestinian village of Rantiya, and the western land belonging to al-Muzayri'a.

To the east of the moshav is an archaeological site, which includes a 3rd Century Roman mausoleum. The mausoleum is the only Roman era building in Israel to still stand from its foundations to its roof. A Byzantine-era mosaic floor was found not far from the mausoleum.

References

Moshavim
Populated places established in 1949
Populated places in Central District (Israel)
1949 establishments in Israel
Czech-Jewish culture in Israel
Hungarian-Jewish culture in Israel
Slovak-Jewish culture in Israel